The PEN/E.O. Wilson Literary Science Writing Award is awarded by the PEN America (formerly PEN American Center) for writing that exemplifies literary excellence on the subject of physical and biological sciences. The award includes a cash prize of $10,000.

The award was founded by scientist and author Dr. Edward O. Wilson, activist and actor Harrison Ford, and the E. O. Wilson Biodiversity Foundation. The award was inaugurated in 2011.

Examples of published works that exemplify the quality of writing the award is designed to acknowledge include Rachel Carson's Silent Spring (1962) and James Watson's The Double Helix  (1969), which contribute 'to the public’s understanding of scientific principles at work in the world today.'

The award is one of many PEN awards sponsored by International PEN affiliates in over 145 PEN centers around the world. The PEN American Center awards have been characterized as being among the "major" American literary prizes.

Award winners

References

External links
 PEN/E. O. Wilson Literary Science Writing Award

PEN America awards
Awards established in 2011
2011 establishments in the United States
Science writing awards